is a Japanese professional golfer.

Mizumaki, graduate of Hosei University, played on the Japan Golf Tour, winning seven times. He also played on the PGA Tour in 1994 and 1995. His best finish was a tie for second (playoff loss to Neal Lancaster) in the 1994 GTE Byron Nelson Golf Classic. He belongs to Naruo Golf Club in Hyogo Prefecture.

Professional wins (11)

Japan Golf Tour wins (7)

*Note: The 1994 Pocari Sweat Open was shortened to 54 holes due to weather.

Japan Golf Tour playoff record (1–0)

Japan Challenge Tour wins (1)

Japan PGA Senior Tour wins (3)
2011 Sakakibara Onsen Golf Club Senior
2016 Encup Fukuoka Senior Open
2020 Cosmohealth Cup Senior Tournament

Playoff record
PGA Tour playoff record (0–1)

Results in major championships

CUT = missed the half-way cut
"T" = tied
Note: Mizumaki only played in The Open Championship.

Team appearances
Dunhill Cup (representing Japan): 1993, 1994

See also
1993 PGA Tour Qualifying School graduates

References

External links

Japanese male golfers
Japan Golf Tour golfers
PGA Tour golfers
Sportspeople from Tokyo
1958 births
Living people